Petar Georgiev (29 January 1965 – 8 August 2013) was a Bulgarian gymnast. He competed in eight events at the 1988 Summer Olympics. He died in a car accident in 2013.

References

1965 births
2013 deaths
Bulgarian male artistic gymnasts
Olympic gymnasts of Bulgaria
Gymnasts at the 1988 Summer Olympics
Gymnasts from Sofia
Road incident deaths in Michigan